Ptychoglene erythrophora is a moth in the subfamily Arctiinae. It was described by Felder in 1874. It is found in Mexico.

References

Moths described in 1874
Cisthenina